Kirsanovsky District is an administrative and municipal district (raion), one of the twenty-three in Tambov Oblast, Russia. It is located in the east of the oblast. The district borders with Gavrilovsky District in the north, Umyotsky District in the east, Inzhavinsky District in the south, and with Rasskazovsky District in the west. Its administrative center is the town of Kirsanov (which is not administratively a part of the district). Population: 21,756 (2010 Census);

Administrative and municipal status
Within the framework of administrative divisions, Kirsanovsky District is one of the twenty-three in the oblast. The town of Kirsanov serves as its administrative center, despite being incorporated separately as a town of oblast significance—an administrative unit with the status equal to that of the districts.

As a municipal division, the district is incorporated as Kirsanovsky Municipal District. The town of oblast significance of Kirsanov is incorporated separately from the district as Kirsanov Urban Okrug.

Notable residents 

Yevgeny Baratynsky (1800–1844), elegiac poet, born in Vyazhlya

References

Notes

Sources

Districts of Tambov Oblast
